April in Portugal is a 1954 travel film narrated by Trevor Howard and starring Jocelyn Lane as Jackie Lane. It was released in 1956.

External links 
 

1954 films
British short films
British short documentary films
1954 documentary films
1950s English-language films
1950s British films